The Serbian Guard ( / Srpska garda) was a Serbian paramilitary active in the Croatian War with close ties to the Serbian Renewal Movement (SPO). Eighty percent of the guard's members were members of the SPO. The paramilitary was formed by SPO official Vuk Drašković and his wife Danica Drašković, along with Đorđe Božović "Giška" and Branislav Matić "Beli". 

The paramilitary unit's training camp was located near Bor Lake in SR Serbia, SFR Yugoslavia. It participated in clashes on the territory of SR Croatia near the town of Gospić. Elements of the unit also participated in the War in Bosnia and Herzegovina. Đorđe Božović was the unit's first commander, but was killed in action near Gospić. Some people have alleged that Božović's death was an act of "friendly fire" orchestrated by the Republic of Serbian Krajina's government. The unit's chief financier Branislav Matić was gunned down in August 1991 in Belgrade. After the death of Božović, the unit was taken over by Branislav Lainović "Dugi" (The "Long").

Serbian general Nebojša Pavković has called for Drašković to be tried for his role in the guard's formation. Having a pro-opposition political stance, the guard was never favoured by the FRY's government and Yugoslav security services.

Notable members
Đorđe Božović "Giška", Serbian career criminal and the founding father of the Guard, KIA during the Croatian war.
Branislav Matić "Beli" ("The White" or "Whitey"), founding father and chief financier, owner of large car junkyards in Belgrade. Gunned down in front of his house in 1991, presumably under the orders of the Yugoslav secret service who had been monitoring him since late 1980s.
Branislav Lainović "Dugi", career criminal and former basketball player. Took control over the Guard after Božović's death. He moved to Novi Sad after the war where he became the kingpin of a local crime syndicate. He was gunned down in Belgrade in 2000 by the members of the Zemun Clan over Novi Sad turf control.
Aleksandar Knežević "Knele", rising star of Belgrade underworld, and the underboss in the Voždovac gang. Assassinated in Hyatt hotel room in 1992, being only 21 at the time. Fought in the Battle of Borovo Selo.
Vaso Pavićević "Pava", Montenegrin Serb capo and former boxer of "Radnički" boxing club. Gunned down in an ambush on Paštrovska Gora in 1996. He commanded the troops in Tenja in 1991.
Žarko Radulović "Đaro", Montenegrin Serb career criminal. Gunned down in Brussels in 1997.

See also
List of Serbian paramilitary formations

References

1991 establishments in Serbia
Anti-communist organizations
Military units and formations established in 1991
Military units and formations of the Croatian War of Independence
Military wings of political parties
Paramilitary organizations based in Serbia
Paramilitary organizations in the Yugoslav Wars
Yugoslav Serbia